Lukáš Daneček (born March 9, 1988 in Havířov) is a Czech professional ice hockey goaltender. He played with HC Oceláři Třinec in the Czech Extraliga during the 2010–11 Czech Extraliga season.

References

External links

1988 births
Czech ice hockey goaltenders
HC Oceláři Třinec players
Living people
People from Havířov
Sportspeople from the Moravian-Silesian Region
HC Frýdek-Místek players
AZ Havířov players
Hokej Šumperk 2003 players
LHK Jestřábi Prostějov players